Karen Petrik (born November 18, 1997) is an American rower. She represented the United States at the 2020 Summer Paralympics.

Career
Petrik represented the United States in the mixed coxed four event at the 2020 Summer Paralympics and won a silver medal.

References

1997 births
Living people
American female rowers
Rowers at the 2020 Summer Paralympics
Medalists at the 2020 Summer Paralympics
Paralympic medalists in rowing
Paralympic silver medalists for the United States
World Rowing Championships medalists for the United States
21st-century American women